Roman Aleksandrovich Adamov (born 4 July 1991) is a former Russian professional football player.

Club career
He made his Russian Football National League debut for FC Luch-Energiya Vladivostok on 1 November 2009 in a game against FC KAMAZ Naberezhnye Chelny. That was his only season in the FNL.

External links
 
 
 Profile by Sportbox

1991 births
Living people
Russian footballers
Association football midfielders
FC Luch Vladivostok players
FC Okean Nakhodka players